Wyoming Highway 32 (WYO 32) is  Wyoming state highway known locally as Emblem Highway. The highway is located in northwestern Big Horn County and travels from the unincorporated community of Emblem north along the Park-Big Horn county line north to the town of Byron and east to Lovell.

Route description
Wyoming Highway 32 has its southern end at US 14 / US 16 / US 20 in the community of Emblem, east of Wyoming Highway 30's western terminus.  Highway 32 heads north-northwest from Emblem, and nears the Park county line where Wyoming Highway 295 has its eastern terminus. WYO 32 continues north, paralleling the county line for a distance, but then turns northeast, roughly paralleling the Shoshone River which runs to the north. WYO 32 south of Byron to Lovell travels southwest to northeast, intersects Wyoming Highway 33 south of Lovell before turning due north and ending at US 14A / US 310 / WYO 789.
Mileposts increase from north to south along Wyoming 32.

Major intersections

References

 Official 2003 State Highway Map of Wyoming

External links 

 Wyoming State Routes 000-099
 WYO 32 - US 14/US 16/US 20 to WYO 295
 WYO 32 - WYO 295 to WYO 33
 WYO 32 - WYO 33 to US 310/US 14A/WYO 789

Transportation in Big Horn County, Wyoming
032